Vincentian can refer to:

A citizen of Saint Vincent and the Grenadines
A person from Saint Vincent (island), the largest island in Saint Vincent and the Grenadines
A member of one of the orders or societies in the Vincentian Family, both Roman Catholic and Anglican, including
Society of Saint Vincent de Paul
Congregation of the Mission
Daughters of Charity of Saint Vincent de Paul
Vincentian Academy, a Roman Catholic preparatory school in Pittsburgh, Pennsylvania
A student or alumnus of St. Vincent's High School, Pune, India
Vincentian Studies Institute, an institute at DePaul University in Chicago, Illinois

See also
 Vincentia (disambiguation)

Language and nationality disambiguation pages